Valeri Abramidze (born 17 January 1980) is a former Georgian footballer.  He also holds Russian citizenship.

Spartak Moscow
Abramidze joined FC Spartak Moscow during summer 2002, signed 5-year contract. He made 15 league appearances for Spartak, and 4 2002 UEFA Champions League as well, scoring no goals.

Being loaned out to FC Uralan Elista in 2003, he left Spartak for FC Khimki in 2004.

Khazar scandal
During 2007 summer mid-season, Abramidze had major issues leaving FK Khazar Lenkoran. While Abramidze was sure he had signed one-year contract in 2006 and now he is free agent, FK Khazar Lenkoran authorities told that he'd signed contract that is 2-year long. The problem seemed to be with contract in Azeri language while Abramidze had not knew Azeri and had not have a translated version.

As a result, Abramidze had lost a lot of time while trying to be transferred to Anzhi, so the club could not include him into the signing list for Russian First Division in 2007. That's why Abramidze was out of football from September 2007 to the season 2008.

Coach
In May 2022, Valeri Abramidze was appointed as a caretaker coach at Rustavi for a few weeks. The next five months he worked at the club as an assistant head coach before becoming an interim head coach in early November 2022.

References

External links
 
  
 

1980 births
Living people
Footballers from Tbilisi
Footballers from Georgia (country)
Expatriate footballers from Georgia (country)
Georgia (country) international footballers
Association football defenders
FC Dinamo Tbilisi players
FC Tbilisi players
FC Lokomotivi Tbilisi players
FC Torpedo Kutaisi players
FC Spartak Moscow players
FC Elista players
FC Anzhi Makhachkala players
FC Khimki players
FC Dynamo Barnaul players
Expatriate footballers in Russia
Expatriate footballers in Azerbaijan
Khazar Lankaran FK players
Russian Premier League players
Expatriate sportspeople from Georgia (country) in Azerbaijan
Shamakhi FK players
FC Sioni Bolnisi players
Expatriate sportspeople from Georgia (country) in Russia